The 2002–03 Biathlon World Cup was a multi-race tournament over a season of biathlon, organised by the International Biathlon Union.

The men's overall World Cup was won by Norway's Ole Einar Bjørndalen, while Martina Glagow of Germany claimed the women's overall World Cup.

Calendar 
Below is the World Cup calendar for the 2004–05 season.

World Cup Podium

Men

Women

Men's team

Women's team

Standings: Men

Overall 

Final standings after 23 races.

Individual 

Final standings after 3 races.

Sprint 

Final standings after 9 races.

Pursuit 

Final standings after 7 races.

Mass Start 

Final standings after 4 races.

Relay 

Final standings after 8 races.

Nation 

Final standings after 20 races.

Standings: Women

Overall 

Final standings after 23 races.

Individual 

Final standings after 3 races.

Sprint 

Final standings after 9 races.

Pursuit 

Final standings after 7 races.

Mass Start 

Final standings after 8 races.

Relay 

Final standings after 8 races.

Nation 

Final standings after 20 races.

Medal table

Achievements
Victory in this World Cup (all-time number of victories in parentheses)

Men
 , 11 (38) first places
 , 3 (15) first places
 , 2 (23) first places
 , 1 (23) first place
 , 1 (12) first place
 , 1 (7) first place
 , 1 (6) first place
 , 1 (1) first place
 , 1 (1) first place
 , 1 (1) first place

Women
 , 4 (5) first places
 , 3 (6) first places
 , 2 (9) first places
 , 2 (4) first places
 , 2 (3) first places
 , 2 (2) first places
 , 2 (2) first places
 , 1 (21) first place
 , 1 (18) first place
 , 1 (2) first place
 , 1 (1) first place
 , 1 (1) first place
 , 1 (1) first place
 , 1 (1) first place

Retirements
The following notable biathletes retired after the 2002–03 season:

References

External links

World Cup
World Cup
Biathlon World Cup